The 2010–11 Challenge de France is the tenth season of the French cup competition for women. The defending champions are Paris Saint-Germain who defeated Montpellier 5–0 in the 2009–10 edition of the competition. The competition is organized by the French Football Federation and is open to all women's French football clubs in France. The final will be held on 21 May 2011 at Stade de la Pépinière in Poitiers. This will be the last season of the competition under the Challenge de France name as the cup will be renamed to the Coupe de France Feminine for the 2011–12 season and onwards.

Calendar
On 15 August 2010, the French Football Federation announced the calendar for the Challenge de France.

First round 
The draw for the first round of the Challenge de France was held on 16 December 2010 at the headquarters of the French Football Federation in Paris. The draw was conducted by current French women's international and Paris Saint-Germain midfielder Élise Bussaglia. The matches were played on 9 January 2011. The canceled will be played on 16 January.

Second round 
The draw for the second round of the Challenge de France was held on 12 January 2011 at the headquarters of the French Football Federation in Paris. The draw was conducted by former French women's international Sandrine Roux. The matches were played on 29–30 January 2011. The canceled match between Val d'Orge–Saint-Malo was played on 6 February.

Round of 32 
The draw for the Round of 32 of the Challenge de France was held on 2 February 2011 at the headquarters of the French Football Federation. The draw was conducted the president of the Ligue du Football Amateur (LFA) Bernard Barbet. The matches will be played on 20–21 February.

Round of 16 
The draw for the Round of 16 of the Challenge de France was held on 23 February 2011 at the headquarters of the French Football Federation in Paris. The draw was conducted by the current coach of the French women's national team Bruno Bini. The matches were played on 13 March.

Quarterfinals 
The draw for the quarterfinals of the Challenge de France was held on 16 March 2011 at the headquarters of the French Football Federation in Paris. The draw was conducted by Henri Emile, the team coordinator of the France national team. The matches were played on 3 April.

Semi-finals 
The draw for the semi-finals of the Challenge de France was held on 16 March 2011 at the headquarters of the French Football Federation in Paris. The draw was conducted by Henri Emile, the team coordinator of the France national team. The matches will be played on 1 May.

Final

References

External links 
 Official site 

2010–11 domestic association football cups
2010–11 in French women's football
Coupe de France Féminine